Lyla Foy (aka Wall) is an English, London-based songwriter and solo artist. She has shared stages with The National, Sharon Van Etten, Midlake, Phosphorescent, and Fleet Foxes. Lyla also sings and plays bass with psychedelic six-piece, Mono Club, fronted by Goldheart Assembly's John Herbert.

2012: "Magazine"
Foy released her debut single "Magazine" in September 2012 under her band's name, Wall. Michael Cragg of The Guardian said of Foy, "You get the sense that even a whisper could overpower her soft coo of a voice."

2013: Shoestring and "Easy"
In March 2013, Foy released her debut EP Shoestring, named after the title track of the same name. The EP also included the tracks "Left to Wonder", "Place Too Low" and "All Alone". Later in 2013 Foy released a double a-side called "Easy" / "Head Down" via the label Subpop.

In 2013, Foy dropped her stage name Wall for her real name, Lyla Foy. She explained, "At first I wanted something abstract to put some distance between me and the identity of the music, but as things grew I wanted to put my name to the songs not the other way round."

2014: Mirrors The Sky
On 18 March 2014, Foy released her debut album, Mirrors The Sky, again with the label Sub Pop. The album contained ten songs, including "Honeymoon", "I Only" and "No Secrets".

One of the songs, "Impossible", serves as the end credits music for the season one episode "Say Anything" of BoJack Horseman.

Discography

Studio Albums
Mirrors the Sky (2014), Sub Pop
Bigger Brighter (2018), INgrooves
Fornever (2021), self-released
Year of the Black Water Rabbit (2023)

Singles and EPs
As Wall:
"Magazine" / "Over My Head" (2012), Black Cab Sessions
"Shoestring" (2013), Big Picnic

As Lyla Foy:
"Cinderella" (2008), Iffy Records
"Easy" / "Head Down" (2013), Sub Pop
"UMi" (2015), self-released

References

Year of birth missing (living people)
Living people
Sub Pop artists
English songwriters
English pop singers
English rock singers